Israel Moore Foster (January 12, 1873 – June 10, 1950) was a Republican Representative in the United States Congress from the state of Ohio, serving three terms from 1919 to 1925.

Biography 
Born in Athens, Ohio, Foster attended the public schools, and graduated from the Ohio University at Athens in 1895.  He studied law at the Harvard Law School in 1895 and 1896, and  graduated from the Ohio State Law School in 1898, commencing practice the same year in Athens, Ohio.

He served as prosecuting attorney of Athens County from 1902 to 1910.  He served as member and secretary of the board of trustees of the Ohio University for twenty-four years, and was Secretary of the Republican State central committee in 1912. After graduating from the Ohio University in 1895, he studied law at the Harvard Law School in 1895 and 1896 before graduating from the Ohio State University College of Law in 1898.

He practiced law in Athens and became the prosecuting attorney of Athens County from 1902 to 1910.  He also served as a member and secretary of the board of trustees of Ohio University for 24 years and was secretary of the Republican State Central Committee in 1912.

Congress 
Foster was elected as a Republican to the Sixty-sixth, Sixty-seventh, and Sixty-eighth Congresses (March 4, 1919 – March 4, 1925).  He was an unsuccessful candidate for renomination in 1924.  While in Congress, he is best known for proposing the Child Labor Amendment to the United States Constitution.

Later career 
After serving in Congress, he was appointed a commissioner of the court of claims on April 1, 1925, and served until April 1, 1942, when he retired.  He died in Washington, D.C., and is buried in Washington's Rock Creek Cemetery.

He has a residence hall at Ohio University named after him, located on South Green. Ohio University administration planned to demolish it in 2014.

Sources

1873 births
1950 deaths
Child labor in the United States
Ohio Bobcats baseball coaches
Ohio University trustees
Ohio State University Moritz College of Law alumni
County district attorneys in Ohio
Ohio University alumni
Harvard Law School alumni
People from Athens, Ohio
Burials at Rock Creek Cemetery
Republican Party members of the United States House of Representatives from Ohio